William Porteous (13 November 1878 - 9 April 1962) was a Scottish footballer who played as a forward.

Born in Dumfriesshire but raised in Linlithgow, he played club football for Heart of Midlothian, Portsmouth and Falkirk and was a  Scottish Cup winner with Hearts in 1901 in which he scored, as well as a losing finalist in 1903 where he missed a good scoring opportunity.

Porteous made one appearance for Scotland in 1903.

References

External links

1878 births
1962 deaths
Scottish footballers
Footballers from Dumfries and Galloway
Footballers from West Lothian
People from Linlithgow
Scotland international footballers
Heart of Midlothian F.C. players
Portsmouth F.C. players
Bo'ness F.C. players
Falkirk F.C. players
Association football forwards
Place of death missing
Scottish Football League players
Southern Football League players